NZM is Neue Zeitschrift für Musik, a German music magazine.

NZM may also refer to:

 Mount Cook Airline (ICAO: NZM)
 Hazrat Nizamuddin railway station (station code: NZM)
 Zeme language (ISO 639:nzm)

See also 
 NZMS (disambiguation)